Jack Strong is a 2014 Polish political thriller film directed by Władysław Pasikowski, starring Marcin Dorociński, Maja Ostaszewska, Dagmara Dominczyk and Patrick Wilson. The film is based on the true story of Ryszard Kukliński, a Polish People's Army colonel who spied for the American Central Intelligence Agency during the height of the Cold War.

Cast

 Marcin Dorociński as Ryszard Kukliński
 Maja Ostaszewska as Hania Kuklińska, Ryszard's wife
 Piotr Nerlewski as Bogdan Kukliński, son of Hanna and Ryszard
 Józef Pawłowski as Waldemar Kukliński, son of Hanna and Ryszard
 Patrick Wilson as David Forden, CIA Operations Officer
 Dagmara Domińczyk as Sue, CIA Operative
 Oleg Maslennikov as Viktor Kulikov, Marshal of the Soviet Union
 Ilja Zmiejew as general Szernienko
 Mirosław Baka as major Putek
 Krzysztof Globisz as General Florian Siwicki, Polish People's Army
 Paweł Małaszyński as Dariusz Ostaszewski
 Dimitri Bilov as Sasha Ivanov
 Krzysztof Pieczyński as Zbigniew Brzeziński, United States National Security Advisor
 Paweł Iwanicki as Walczak
 Zbigniew Zamachowski as colonel Gendera
 Ireneusz Czop as Marian Rakowiecki
 Piotr Grabowski as agent of counterintelligence
 Krzysztof Dracz as General Wojciech Jaruzelski, Polish People's Army
 Eduard Bezrodniy as Oleg Penkovsky
 Antoni Barłowski as Kowalik
 Michalina Olszańska as Iza

Filming
Photography started in January 2013. The film was shot in the offices of the General Staff of the Polish Armed Forces and in Warsaw, Gdańsk, Legnica, Washington D.C. and Moscow.

Release
The film was released in Poland on February 7, 2014. The film was released in the United Kingdom and in Ireland on February 14, 2014. The film was released in the United States on July 24, 2015, in a limited release and through video on demand by Level 33 Entertainment.

References

External links
 
 Official Jack Strong Website

2014 films
2014 biographical drama films
2014 in Poland
2014 crime films
2010s mystery films
2010s political thriller films
2014 action thriller films
Polish biographical films
English-language Polish films
Films about the Central Intelligence Agency
Films directed by Wladyslaw Pasikowski
Political thriller films
Cold War spy films
Films shot in Warsaw